Eric Anders Smith (born 8 January 1997) is a Swedish professional footballer who plays as a midfielder for FC St. Pauli.

Career
In January 2016, Smith joined Swedish team IFK Norrköping, and moved abroad in June 2018 signing with Gent.

Smith joined 2. Bundesliga club FC St. Pauli on loan for the second half of the 2020–21 season. FC St. Pauli secured an option to sign him permanently.

Personal life
Smith was born in Sweden, and his father Anders is a former footballer.

Career statistics

References

External links
 
 

1997 births
Living people
Sportspeople from Halmstad
Sportspeople from Halland County
Swedish footballers
Association football midfielders
Sweden youth international footballers
Allsvenskan players
Belgian Pro League players
Eliteserien players
2. Bundesliga players
Halmstads BK players
IFK Norrköping players
K.A.A. Gent players
Tromsø IL players
FC St. Pauli players
Swedish expatriate footballers
Swedish expatriate sportspeople in Belgium
Expatriate footballers in Belgium
Swedish expatriate sportspeople in Norway
Expatriate footballers in Norway
Swedish expatriate sportspeople in Germany
Expatriate footballers in Germany